Nochelaspis is an extinct genus of Galeaspid. It lived during the Lochkovian period in Lower Devonian East Asia (in today southeastern China and northern Vietnam).

Description
 
Nochelaspis is the largest Eugaleaspid so far described.
It is an element of the Early Vertebrate fauna in the Xishancun Formation, and lived among Polybranchiaspids, Paleoniscoids, Crossopterygians, Arthrodires, Antiarchs, and Petalichthyids.

References 

Galeaspida
Fossil taxa described in 1992
Prehistoric jawless fish genera